The Mobile DTV Alliance is a marketing organization based in San Ramon, California that was founded in 2006 by a consortium of companies to promote open standards for mobile TV.  Its goal is the rapid adoption of mobile TV technology via DVB-H and to further the mobile TV experience in North America.

The President of the Mobile DTV Alliance, Yoram Solomon, is also on the boards of the WiMedia Alliance and Wi-Fi Alliance.

The Alliance was founded by Intel, Microsoft, Modeo, Motorola, Nokia and Texas Instruments.

References 

 Alliance formed to promote mobile TV, Financial Times, Jan 23, 2006
 DTV Alliance Takes Mobile TV To The Masses, PC Magazine, Jan 24, 2006
 Report: Consumers ready for mobile TV, Information Week, Jan 25, 2007
 

Consortia in the United States
Mobile television
2006 establishments in California
Organizations based in the San Francisco Bay Area
San Ramon, California